Skatestoppers are skate-deterrent or anti-skate devices placed on urban terrain features such as benches and handrails to discourage skateboarders grinding on the surfaces where they have been installed; they are a form of hostile architecture.

The name Skatestopper is a registered trademark of Intellicept of El Cajon, California, but in some skateboarding circles it has become a genericized term referring to any anti-skate device.

Design
The most basic design is an L-shaped bracket affixed at intervals along the grind-able structure. Early designs were made from nylon while more recent designs have been made from aluminum. At the same time more ornamental versions have been produced. The devices have been targeted for removal by skateboarders resulting in attempts to make them tamper resistant.

Criticism
Some have viewed skatestoppers as just another obstacle to be overcome and the presence of skatestoppers actually encourages them to stay in the location longer.

References

External links
 

Skating